HMS Loch Glendhu was a Royal Navy  named after Loch Glendhu in Scotland. She was built at the Burntisland Shipbuilding Company's shipyard in Burntisland, Fife, Scotland in 1944.

Publications
 

 

Glendu (K619)
Loch Glendu (K619)
Loch Glendu (K619)
1944 ships